The Motorola Pebl (styled PEBL, pronounced pebble) is a series of clamshell/flip mobile phones from Motorola, and is one of the series in the 4LTR line.

U6

The Pebl U6 was announced in early 2005. Pebl is named for its small and sleek appearance, as well as to evoke comparisons to a "pebble," which has been worn smooth over time.

The U6 sold in the millions of units.

Design and appearance

The body of the Pebl U6 is primarily made out of metal, although everything other than the hinge has a colour coating which makes it matte rather than shiny.  The external texture is polished but not quite smooth, resisting finger prints and smudges.  Buttons and connectors are kept flush in order to maintain the phone's smooth appearance.  In contrast to many other products with a one line external display, the external screen is mounted vertically, rather than horizontally.

The unit is held closed by magnets, and can be opened with a single hand by pushing the lid of the phone away from the hinge mechanism.  The hinge itself is spring-loaded, so that when cracked it actively swings fully open.

Initially, the product was available only in black, but in the second quarter of 2006, Motorola launched four additional colours.  It was produced in black, blue, green, red, orange and pink, although the exact colour selection varied per country.  Shortly before the new colors became available, Motorola commissioned photographer David LaChapelle to capture the new Pebl phones in a colourful photo shoot.

Additional features
 Java ME MIDP 2.0 compatible
 MMS, Wireless Village instant messaging and e-mail
 Motorola SCREEN3 push technology for dynamic news and content
 MPEG-4 video and JPEG still image capture
 Speaker-independent voice dialing
 WAP 2.0 web browser
 Integrated speakerphone (handsfree)

U9

Three years later, the U9 was released. It features Motorola's MotoMagx OS, a better display, an improved 2.0-megapixel camera, a microSD card slot and touch-sensitive music keys. The phone was made available in the first half of 2008.

U3

December 2008 saw the release of the U3. This was a more basic version - it did not have a memory card slot, no Bluetooth and a lower screen resolution.

See also
 Motorola RAZR
 Motorola ROKR
 Motorola SLVR

Notes and references

External links
 Motorola Pebl - Page on Motorola's website detailing the PEBL
 Super Bowl commercial - Ad for the Pebl on Google Video that aired during the 2006 Super Bowl
 Motorola's Pebl Pond
 Motorola Pebl U6 - Mobiledia
 Motorola Pebl U6 Review - PhoneRev

Pebl
Mobile phones introduced in 2005